Abbasabad (also Romanized as ‘Abbāsābād) is a village in Bala Khvaf Rural District, Salami District, Khaf County, Razavi Khorasan Province, Iran. At the 2006 census, its population was 1,181, in 274 families.

See also 

 List of cities, towns and villages in Razavi Khorasan Province

References 

Populated places in Khaf County